A list of American films released in 1948.

A

B

C

D

E

F

G

H

I

J

K

L

M

N

O

P-Q

R

S

T

U-V

W

Y

Documentaries

Serials

Shorts

See also
 1948 in the United States

References

External links

 1948 films at the Internet Movie Database

1948
Films
Lists of 1948 films by country or language